Richard Bright (1822 – 28 February 1878) was an English politician.

He was born the son of Robert Bright and the brother of colonial businessman Charles Edward Bright and General Sir Robert Onesiphorus Bright.

He was Conservative Member of Parliament (MP) for East Somerset from 1868 to 1878.

References 
F W S Craig, British Parliamentary Election Results 1832-1885 (2nd edition, Aldershot: Parliamentary Research Services, 1989)

External links 

1822 births
1878 deaths
Conservative Party (UK) MPs for English constituencies
UK MPs 1868–1874
UK MPs 1874–1880